Hugh McLaughlin may refer to:

 Hugh McLaughlin (publisher) (1918–2006), Irish publisher and inventor
 Hugh McLaughlin Sr. (1909–1977), Australian rules footballer for South Melbourne and Footscray
 Hugh McLaughlin Jr. (1935–2004), Australian rules footballer for South Melbourne
 Hugh McLaughlin (politician) (1827–1904), American politician
 Hugh McLaughlin (footballer, born 1943), Scottish footballer for Brentford
 Hugh McLaughlin (footballer, born 1945) (died 2020), Scottish footballer for St Mirren